James R. Kass is a Canadian physicist engaged in the field of human spaceflight.

Biography
Kass holds a Bachelor of Science (BSc) in physics and mathematics (Montreal) and a Master of Science (MS) in physics (Ann Arbor, Michigan), and a Doctor of Philosophy (PhD) in physics in Leeds, England.

After he completed his PhD Dr Kass joined the Max-Planck Institute to research in Nuclear Physics. Starting a career of more than 30 years in human spaceflight, he worked as a scientist at the department of medicine at Joh.-Gutenberg University, Mainz, Germany, where he researched in Neurophysiology and space medicine, particularly in the area of sensory perception. This work was carried out in conjunction with two Spacelab missions, Spacelab-1 and Spacelab-D1.

Kass started his circuitous route to human spaceflight at the height of the Space Age in 1962, when he registered at Sir George Williams University in Montreal attempting to commence studies in this domain. In the absence of a university program on space flight, he studied physics and mathematics, and proceeded to become a research fellow in nuclear physics. But, as fate would have it, he finally fulfilled his dream, when some 20 years later he sat at the Johnson Spaceflight Centre (JSC) in Houston and directed the astronaut crew Ulf Merbold, Byron Lichtenberg, Robert Parker, and Skylab veteran Owen Garriott, to perform experiments in the domain of vestibular physiology prepared by a team of European investigators, of which he was one.

Following this he worked for the aerospace industry in Bremen and Munich in the sectors of space operations, tele-medical research, artificial intelligence, and human behaviour, performing work in neutral buoyancy, in parabolic flight, with the Mir station and with long-duration isolation missions. He was recruited to work for the European Space Agency (ESA) at their establishment in The Netherlands, ESTEC as senior scientist in 2000 where he worked on the STS-107 Spacehab/Space Shuttle mission. He has worked in the psychology of long-duration spaceflight, lecturing at University College London (UCL) (England) and Concordia University (Montreal, Quebec, Canada).

He has worked in the fields of telemedicine and eHealth, being a member of the Telemedicine Alliance project, where he contributed to Data Privacy, and eSurveillance. He is an adviser on the Mars One project, on which he was co-editor of a book on this subject. He currently runs a space consultancy, and has advised the European Commission in the domain of knowledge mgmt, carried out training in the domain of sharing knowledge and lessons learned, and arranges collaborative efforts between the European Space Agency Business Applications program and industry. In the domain of Lessons Learned, he has been an invited speaker  at the European Commission and interviewed  on this subject.

References

Mars One
Living people
Year of birth missing (living people)
Alumni of the University of Leeds
Canadian physicists
Concordia University alumni
Max Planck Society people
University of Michigan alumni